Kenya competed at the 2004 Summer Olympics in Athens, Greece, from 13 to 29 August 2004. This was the nation's eleventh appearance at the Olympics, except the 1976 Summer Olympics in Montreal and the 1980 Summer Olympics in Moscow because of the African and United States boycott.

National Olympic Committee Kenya (NOCK) sent the nation's smallest delegation to the Games since the 1968 Summer Olympics in Mexico City. A total of 46 athletes, 22 men and 24 women, competed only in athletics (specifically in the middle-distance events and marathon), rowing, swimming, and volleyball, the nation's team-based sport at these games. For the first time in its Olympic history, Kenya was represented by more female than male athletes due to the participation of the women's volleyball team. The Kenyan team featured Olympic medalists Paul Tergat in men's marathon, and Bernard Lagat, who would emigrate to America a year later, in the men's middle-distance running. Among these medalists, Lagat only managed to add a bronze medal to his career hardware for the Kenyan team at these Games before his impending transfer. Volleyball team captain Violet Barasa became the nation's first ever female flag bearer in the opening ceremony.

Kenya left Athens with a total of seven Olympic medals (one gold, four silver, and two bronze), matching its record with Sydney four years earlier. Ezekiel Kemboi managed to capture the nation's only gold medal in the men's 3000 m steeplechase, and enjoyed his teammates Brimin Kipruto and Paul Kipsiele Koech taking home the silver and bronze, as they all climbed on top of the podium for the second time in Kenya's Olympic history since 1992.

Medalists

Athletics 

Kenyan athletes have so far achieved qualifying standards in the following athletics events (up to a maximum of 3 athletes in each event at the 'A' Standard, and 1 at the 'B' Standard).

Men

Women

Rowing

Men

Qualification Legend: FA=Final A (medal); FB=Final B (non-medal); FC=Final C (non-medal); FD=Final D (non-medal); FE=Final E (non-medal); FF=Final F (non-medal); SA/B=Semifinals A/B; SC/D=Semifinals C/D; SE/F=Semifinals E/F; R=Repechage

Swimming 

Men

Women

Volleyball

Women's tournament

Roster

Group play

See also
 Kenya at the 2004 Summer Paralympics
 Kenya at the 2006 Commonwealth Games

References

External links
Official Report of the XXVIII Olympiad

Nations at the 2004 Summer Olympics
2004
Summer Olympics